The Dissolve is the fourth studio album by electronic musician Boxcutter.

Track listing 

Boxcutter 	                Panama 	
Boxcutter 	                Zabriskie Disco 	
Boxcutter ft. Brian Greene  	All Too Heavy
Boxcutter vs. Ken & Ryu 	Cold War
Boxcutter 	                Passerby 	
Boxcutter 	                TV Troubles 	
Boxcutter ft. Brian Greene  	The Dissolve
Boxcutter 	                Factory Setting 	
Boxcutter 	                Topsoil 	
Boxcutter vs. Kab Driver 	Little Smoke Remix
Boxcutter ft. Brian Greene 	Ufonik

References

2011 albums
Boxcutter (musician) albums
Planet Mu albums